Ragnhild Kostøl (born 25 May 1969) is a Norwegian cyclist. She was born in Oslo. She won the Norwegian National Road Race Championship in 1991 and 1999.

She competed at the 1996 and the 2000 Summer Olympics.

References

External links

1969 births
Living people
Cyclists from Oslo
Norwegian female cyclists
Olympic cyclists of Norway
Cyclists at the 1996 Summer Olympics
Cyclists at the 2000 Summer Olympics